The Granite Building is a historic department store building located at 124 East Main Street in Rochester, Monroe County, New York.

Description and history 
Its facade is a mix of Second Renaissance Revival style and Beaux-Arts style classical details. It is characterized by recessed, monumental, four story granite columns supporting recessed arches. It was built by Sibley, Lindsay & Curr Company and served as their flagship store until the "Sibley fire" of 1904, when the flagship moved to the Sibley's, Lindsay and Curr Building.

It was listed on the National Register of Historic Places on October 11, 1984.

Gallery

References

External links

Skyscrapers in Rochester, New York
Commercial buildings on the National Register of Historic Places in New York (state)
Renaissance Revival architecture in New York (state)
Commercial buildings completed in 1893
Retail buildings in New York (state)
Department stores on the National Register of Historic Places
National Register of Historic Places in Rochester, New York
Commercial buildings in Rochester, New York